Thanmoia is a genus of grasshoppers in the subfamily Oxyinae found in Vietnam.

Species
The Orthoptera Species File lists the following:
Thanmoia ceracrifucosa Storozhenko, 1992
Thanmoia gustavi Ramme, 1941 = type species
Thanmoia maculata Willemse, 1957
Thanmoia olivacea Willemse, 1957

References

Oxyinae
Acrididae genera
Orthoptera of Asia
Invertebrates of Vietnam